St. Francis de Sales Church or Saint Francis de Sales Catholic Church may refer to:

United States
St. Francis de Sales, a church in the East Dade Deanery of Miami, Florida
St. Francis de Sales Catholic Church (Mableton, Georgia)
St. Francis de Sales Church (Keokuk, Iowa)
St. Francis de Sales Catholic Church (Paducah, Kentucky)
St. Francis de Sales Church (Norton Shores, Michigan)
St. Francis de Sales Church (St. Louis, Missouri) 
St. Francis de Sales Roman Catholic Church (Buffalo, New York)
St. Francis deSales Church (Geneva, New York), Catholic church
St. Francis de Sales Catholic Church (Lexington, New York)
St. Francis de Sales Roman Catholic Church (Manhattan, NYC)
Saint Francis De Sales Catholic Church (Cincinnati, Ohio)
St. Frances de Sales Chapel, a church in the Roman Catholic Diocese of Toledo
St. Francis de Sales Roman Catholic Church (Philadelphia), Pennsylvania
St Francis de Sales Church, in the Queens Chapel neighborhood of Washington, D.C.

Elsewhere
St. Francis de Sales Roman Catholic Church (Ajax, Ontario), a Catholic church in Canada
St Francis de Sales' Church, in Wash Common, Newbury, Berkshire, England
St Francis de Sales, Hampton Hill and Upper Teddington, London, England

See also
Oblates of St. Francis de Sales
Cathedral of St. Francis de Sales (disambiguation)